The Atchison, Topeka and Santa Fe Railway class 5011 was the last class of steam locomotives to be purchased by AT&SF. The class was introduced by Baldwin Locomotive Works in 1944.

History
A total of 25 of these large engines were built. They were nicknamed "War Babies" by the AT&SF from being built and used during World War II.

The AT&SF ran the class from the mid-1940s to the mid-late 1950s. Despite being mainly freight haulers, their driving wheels were unusually tall for a "Texas" type, which led to them also being successful in passenger service.

Specifications
Numbers 5011 to 5035, when built, were the largest and fastest class of "Texas"-type locomotives ever built and equipped with Timken roller bearings on every axle. 

Present day

Four of the class 5011 locomotives were preserved by the AT&SF for museums, with the remainder being scrapped. 

The four preserved locomotives are:                                                                                                                                                      
 #5011 — at the National Museum of Transportation, Kirkwood, Missouri.                                                                                                                                       
 #5017 — at the National Railroad Museum, Green Bay, Wisconsin                                                                                                                          
 #5021 — at the California State Railroad Museum, Sacramento, California.                                                                                                                  
 #5030 — at Salvador Perez Park, in Santa Fe, New Mexico.

See also

References

Atchison, Topeka and Santa Fe Railway locomotives
Steam locomotives of the United States
2-10-4 locomotives
Baldwin locomotives
Freight locomotives
Preserved steam locomotives of the United States